11 Ursae Minoris b is an extrasolar planet which orbits the K-type giant star 11 Ursae Minoris, located approximately 390 light years away in the constellation Ursa Minor. Since inclination is not known, the actual mass is unknown. This planet may actually be a brown dwarf if a true mass is over 13 times that of Jupiter. This planet takes 17 months to orbit the star at the average distance of 1.54 AU in a circular orbit. This superjovian planet was detected by radial velocity method on August 12, 2009.

References

 

Exoplanets discovered in 2009
Giant planets
Ursa Minor (constellation)
Exoplanets detected by radial velocity